The Howland Chapel School is a historic school building for African-American students located near Heathsville, Northumberland County, Virginia.  It was built in 1867, and is a one-story, gable fronted frame building measuring approximately 26 feet by 40 feet. It features board-and-batten siding and distinctive bargeboards with dentil soffits. The interior has a single room divided by a later central partition formed by sliding, removable doors.  The building is a rare, little-altered Reconstruction-era schoolhouse built to serve the children of former slaves.  Its construction was funded by New York educator, reformer and philanthropist Emily Howland (1827-1929), for whom the building is named.  It was used as a schoolhouse until 1958, and serves as a museum, community center and adult-education facility.

It was listed on the National Register of Historic Places in 1991.

References

School buildings on the National Register of Historic Places in Virginia
Carpenter Gothic architecture in Virginia
School buildings completed in 1867
Buildings and structures in Northumberland County, Virginia
National Register of Historic Places in Northumberland County, Virginia